And Berry Came Too is a 1936 collection of comic short stories by the English author Dornford Yates (Cecil William Mercer), featuring his recurring 'Berry' characters.

Plot 
The book consists of eight short stories, mostly set in Hampshire. According to an introductory note by the author, the action of the book may be presumed to have taken place during the summer between the events of chapters 1 and 2 of Berry and Co., ie some 16 years earlier. In addition to the regular "Berry & Co" characters this book also features the family's two-year-old Alsatian "The Knave", and a visiting American, Perdita Boyte.

Background 
All of the stories in And Berry Came Too had originally appeared in The Windsor Magazine between May and December 1935. They were written while Mercer was settled at Pau with his second wife, Elizabeth (whom he thought of as 'Jill', and to whom the book was dedicated).

Chapters  

Four of the stories were serialised in Woman's Home Companion during 1935, illustrated by Frederick Chapman - chapter 1 in March, chapter 2 in May, chapter 4 in July and chapter 5 in September, under the same titles as The Windsor.

Illustrations
The illustrations from the Windsor stories by E G Oakdale (presumed to be Edmund Oakdale, known for his railway travel posters) were not included in the book version.

Critical reception 
Punch reviewed the book on 29 January 1936. The reviewer welcomed the return of Berry after an absence of five years and suggested that the publication would be met with "a loud and general cheer". There was, however, some  criticism of the author's "curious blind spot" in his portrayal of women, and in particular the way in which the narrator, Boy, maintains a commentary on the beauty, sweetness and virtue of the female characters, and the way in which he enthusiastically and repeatedly likens his girlfriend to a child. AJ Smithers in his 1982 biography considered this criticism to be 'entirely fair'.

References

Bibliography
 

1936 short story collections
Ward, Lock & Co. books
Short story collections by Dornford Yates